"Every River" is a song written by American country music artist Kim Richey along with Angelo Petraglia and Tom Littlefield.  First recorded by Richey on her 1997 album Bitter Sweet, it was later covered by duo Brooks & Dunn, who released it as the fifth and final single from the 2001 album Steers & Stripes. It entered the Billboard Hot Country Songs Chart on the week of September 7, 2002. It peaked at number 12 on the week of December 14, 2002.  It was more recently covered by "British Invasion" band The Searchers.
It was also covered by Irish singer and musician Maura O'Connell, who included it on her 2001 album Walls & Windows.

Chart positions
"Every River" debuted at number 54 on the U.S. Billboard Hot Country Singles & Tracks chart for the week of September 7, 2002.

References

2002 singles
Brooks & Dunn songs
Songs written by Kim Richey
Songs written by Angelo Petraglia
Song recordings produced by Mark Wright (record producer)
Arista Nashville singles